Aduana may refer to:
 Aduana, an Akan clan
 Aduana Building, a Spanish colonial structure in Manila, Philippines
 Aduana Stars, a professional football club, based in Dormaa Ahenkro, Brong-Ahafo, Ghana